WRGC may refer to:

 WRGC (AM), a radio station (540 AM) licensed to Sylva, North Carolina, United States
 WRGC-FM, a radio station (88.3 FM) licensed under construction permit to Milledgeville, Georgia, United States